Freinsheim is a Verbandsgemeinde ("collective municipality") in the district of Bad Dürkheim, Rhineland-Palatinate, Germany. The seat of the Verbandsgemeinde is in Freinsheim.

The Verbandsgemeinde Freinsheim consists of the following Ortsgemeinden ("local municipalities"):

Bobenheim am Berg
Dackenheim
Erpolzheim
Freinsheim
Herxheim am Berg
Kallstadt
Weisenheim am Berg
Weisenheim am Sand

Verbandsgemeinde in Rhineland-Palatinate